This is a comprehensive list of obstacles used for the American game show Wipeout from 2008-2014, and its reboot (2021-2022).

Format
During an episode, contestants compete through four rounds of competition, each round featuring less and less contestants as they are eliminated. The first round features 24 contestants, the second round features 12 contestants, the third round features 6, and only the top four (top three in seasons 4-6) make it to the final round called the Wipeout Zone, where the winner earns the title of Wipeout Champion and a $50,000 grand prize.  In season 8 (reboot), there are three rounds until a final team wins. The first round features 20 contestants (10 teams), the second round features 6 teams, competing in 2 heats, with only the first team from both heats making it to the final round called the Wipeout Zone, where the winners earn the title of Wipeout Champion and a $25,000 grand prize.

Qualifier
(ABC Original) In the first round, 24 contestants run a four to five-part obstacle course, one at a time. If the contestant fails to pass a particular obstacle, they must swim to the next obstacle. The 12 fastest contestants advance to the next round.

(TBS Reboot) In the first round, 10 teams of two run a five part obstacle course. Both teammates face the course at the same time, and must wait for each other to finish each obstacle. The fastest 6 teams advance to the next round.

Although many of the obstacles vary between episodes, common obstacles have included the "Sucker Punch", a wall covered with mechanical boxing gloves above a mud pit (not seen in seasons 4-6, and seasons 8-9), and the show's trademark obstacle, the "Big Balls", consisting of a set of four giant inflated red balls that a contestant must attempt to bounce across, which have appeared in every episode. In addition, the contestants who manage to grab Smallsy on the 4th ball will receive a bonus cash prize.

Season 1 (2008)
 Episode 1: Topple Towers, Sucker Punch, Big Balls, and Cookie Cutter Swing
 Episode 2: Slippery Stairs, Sucker Punch, Big Balls, and Block Swing
 Episode 3: Donut Run, Sucker Punch with No Handles, Big Balls, and Pole Vault
 Episode 4: Tumble Tubes, Sucker Punch, Big Balls, and Wall Swing
 Episode 5: Dirty Balls, Sucker Punch with Balls, Big Balls, and Ball Swing
 Episode 6: Buoy Run, Sucker Punch, Big Balls, and Field Goal Swing
 Episode 7: (NONE) Wipey's Awards
 Episode 8: Topple Towers, Butt Kicker, Big Balls, and Donut Swing
 Episode 9: Human Pinball, Sucker Punch with No Handles, Big Balls, and Leap of Faith
 Episode 10: Tumble Tubes, Sucker Punch with Punch, Big Balls, and Bubble Bath Swing
 Episode 11: (NONE) Top 25 Moments

Season 2 (2009)
 Episode 1: (Super Bowl) Heavy Bag Run, Big Balls with Linebacker Motivator, 10 Yard Dash, and Bouncy Football Bridge
 Episode 2: A Bridge Too Far, Sucker Punch, Big Balls with Hammer Motivator, Hurtles, and Foamy Slippery Swing Set
 Episode 3: Plank in the Face, Big Balls with Hammer Motivator, Log Roll with Wrecking Balls, and Fender Bender
 Episode 4: Banana Hammocks, Sucker Punch, Big Balls with Hammer Motivator, Trampoline Hurtles, and Foamy Sidewalk Swing Set with Zip-line and Curtain
 Episode 5: Sweeper Run, Big Balls with Hammer Motivator, Shish Kebab, and Fender Bender with Incline
 Episode 6: Break Away Planks, Big Balls with Hammer Motivator, Log Roll with Rolling Stones, and Fender Bender
 Episode 7: Rug Pull, Sucker Punch, Big Balls with Hammer Motivator, Hurtle Hoops, and Ice Age Dawn of the Dinosaurs Movie Set: Tropical Bridge and Icy Swing Set
 Episode 8: Spiked Fenders, Sucker Punch, Big Balls with Hammer Motivator, Trampoline Hurtles, and Zip-line Swing Set
 Episode 9: Diving Board Trapeze, Big Balls with Hammer Motivator, Log Roll Maze, and Fender Bender
 Episode 10: Sweeper Trees, Sucker Punch, Big Balls with Hammer Motivator, Hurtles, and Slippery Swing Set
 Episode 11: Break Away Planks, Big Balls with Hammer Motivator, Log Roll with Loose Noodles, and Fender Bender
 Episode 12: Spiked Fenders, Sucker Punch, Big Balls with Hammer Motivator, Trampoline Hurtles, and Trapeze Swing Set
 Episode 13: Sweeper Run, Big Balls with Hammer Motivator, Log Balls with Zip-line, and Fender Bender
 Episode 14: Bally-Go-Round, Sucker Punch, Big Balls with Hammer Motivator, Hurtles, and Swinging Cereal Killer
 Episode 15: Tipsy Towers, Big Balls with Hammer Motivator, Brush Rush, and Fender Bender
 Episode 16: (Australia Special) Topple Towers, Sucker Punch, Big Balls, and Ring Swing
 Episode 17: Banana Split, Sucker Punch with Pudding, Big Balls with Hammer Motivator, Dangerous Donuts, and Onion Ring Swing

Season 3 (2010)
 Episode 1: Springy Steps, Sucker Punch with Paint, Big Balls with Platform Motivator, Trampoline Sweeper, and Fling Set (Love Handles)
 Episode 2: Fence Flappers, Sucker Punch with Paint, Big Balls with Hammer Motivator, Foamy Shake-a-lator with Mini Wrecking Balls, and Shape Shifter with Trampoline
 Episode 3: Door Knock, Sucker Punch with Paint, Bouncy Big Balls with Hammer Motivator, Shake-a-lator, Shape Shifter with Zip-line
 Episode 4: White Water Rafting, Sucker Punch with Paint, World Cup Soccer Balls with Platform Motivator, Trampoline Sweeper, and Fling Set
 Episode 5: Topple Towers, Sucker Punch with Paint, Big Balls with Platform Motivator, Trampoline Sweeper with Biker Bar, and Fling Set with Curtain
 Episode 6: Blob Launch, Sucker Punch with Paint, Big Balls with Hammer Motivator, Shake-a-lator with Mini Wrecking Balls, and Shape Shifter with Trampoline
 Episode 7: Trampo-mean, Sucker Punch with Paint, Bouncy Big Balls with Hammer Motivator, Shake-a-lator with Small Balls, and Shape Shifter with Diving Board
 Episode 8: Smackwall Sweeper, Sucker Punch with Paint, Big Balls with Platform Motivator, Organ Grinder, and Trouble U's
 Episode 9: Dirty Diving Boards, Sucker Punch with Paint, Big Balls with Hammer Motivator, Shake-a-lator with The Wrecking Ball and the Slow Wrecking Ball, and Shape Shifter with Slide
 Episode 10: Trick Stairs, Hoop Run, Sucker Punch with Paint, Big Balls with Platform Motivator, Foamy Trampoline Sweeper, and Fling Set with Square
 Episode 11: Door Knock, Sucker Punch with Paint, Bouncy Big Balls with Hammer Motivator, Shake-a-lator, and Shape Shifter with Swing
 Episode 12: Pitchfork Tumblers, Sucker Punch with Paint, Big Balls with Platform Motivator, Trampoline Sweeper, and Foamy Fling Set
 Episode 13: Unbalanced Beams, Sucker Punch with Paint, Big Balls with Hammer Motivator, Shake-a-lator with Small Balls, and Shape Shifter with Swing
 Episode 14: Smackwall Sweeper, Sucker Punch with Paint, Big Balls with Platform Motivator, Beaten Path, and Trouble U’s
 Episode 15: Collapsing Catwalk, Sucker Punch with Paint, Big Balls with Platform Motivator, Trampoline Sweeper with Beauty Bar, and Fling Set (Chick Flick)
 Episode 16: Hoop Run, Sucker Punch with Paint, Bouncy Big Balls with Hammer Motivator, Shake-a-lator with Velvet Ropes and Small Balls, and Shape Shifter with Diving Board
 Episode 17: Rumble Bridge, Sucker Punch with Paint, Big Balls with Platform Motivator, Trampoline Sweeper, and Fling Set with Square
 Episode 18: (Red White and Blue Qualifier) Sweeper Trees, Patriotic Sucker Punch with Paint, Big Balls with Hammer Motivator (Red White and Blue Balls), Shake-o-lator with Velvet Ropes and Small Balls, and Shape Shifter with Slide

Season 4: Winter Wipeout (2011)
 Episode 1: Sled Slide, Nana’s House, Big Balls with Snow-tivator, Snowplow Sweeper, and Yule Log Jam
 Episode 2: Mogul Madness, Big Balls with Snow-tivator, Snowplow Sweeper, and Yule Log Jam with Spanker Bar
 Episode 3: Tube Slide, Winter Wonder Planks, Big Balls with Snow-tivator, Snowplow Sweeper, and Yule Log Jam with Spanker Bar
 Episode 4: Winter Brrr Blob, Big Balls with Snow-tivator, Snowman Sweeper, and Yule Log Jam with Spanker Bar
 Episode 5: Sled Slide, Gingerbread House, Big Balls with Snow-tivator, Snowman Sweeper, and Yule Log Jam with Ring
 Episode 6: Ski Slide, Holiday Hams, Big Balls with Snow-tivator, Snowplow Sweeper, and Yule Log Jam with Walls and Spanker Bar
 Episode 7: Snowman Surprise, Big Balls with Snow-tivator, Polar Bear Express, and Yule Log Jam with Ring
 Episode 8: Side-by-side Ski Slide, Snowblower, Big Balls with Snow-tivator, Polar Bear Express, and Yule Log Jam with Spanker Bar

Season 4: Spring Wipeout (2011)
 Episode 1: Bed Bugs, Big Balls with Springivator, Spring Fling with Trampoline, and Wipeout Kitchen
 Episode 2: Flipsy Daisy, Big Balls with Springivator, Spring Fling with Trampoline, and Ballsy’s Kitchen
 Episode 3: Scarecase, Big Balls with Springivator, Spring Fling with Diving Board, and Wipeout Kitchen
 Episode 4: Bowled Over, Big Balls with Springivator, Spring Fling with Diving Board, and Wipeout Kitchen
 Episode 5: Spring Training, Big Balls with Springivator, Spring Fling with Zipline, and Wipeout Kitchen
 Episode 6: Faulty Bridge, Twister Mill, Big Balls with Springivator, Spring Fling with Green Ball, and Wipeout Laundromat
 Episode 7: Love Boat Launch, Big Balls with Springivator, Spring Fling with Green Ball, and Wipeout Kitchen

Season 4: Summer Wipeout (2011)
 Episode 1: Wipeout Wall, Driver's Ed, Big Balls with Spinning Balls, Jiggle-ator, and Double Barrel
 Episode 2: Wipeout Car Wash, Driver's Ed, Big Balls with Spinning Balls, Jiggle-ator with Sail, and Double Barrel with Ice Cream
 Episode 3: Lawnmowers, Big Balls with Dreadmill, Mood Swing with Turntable, and Chinese Restaurant
 Episode 4: Wipeout Pinball, Big Balls with Dreadmill, Mood Swing with Trapeze, and Wipeout Cantina
 Episode 5: Wheel of Misfortune, Driver's Ed, Big Balls with Spinning Balls, Jiggle-ator, and Double Barrel
 Episode 6: Double Sweeper Dive, Big Balls with Dreadmill, Mood Swing with Turntable and Wipeout School Cafeteria
 Episode 7: Teeter Towers, Big Balls with Dreadmill, Mood Swing with Slide, Wipeout Nursery
 Episode 8: Caterpillar Crossing, Drivers Ed, Big Balls, Jiggle-ator with Doghouse and Dogs, and Double Barrel with Cookies
 Episode 9: Wipeout Car Wash, Driver's Ed, Big Balls, Jiggle-ator with Sail, and Double Barrel with Frosting
 Episode 10: Kindergarten Chaos, Big Balls with Dreadmill, Mood Swing with Slide, and Nana’s Kitchen
 Episode 11: Bucking Broncos, Driver's Ed, Big Balls, Jiggle-ator with Monkeys, and Double Barrel with Pizza
 Episode 12: Ballsy's Playground, Driver's Ed, Big Balls, Jiggle-ator, and Double Barrel (Ballsy's Aquatic Adventure)
 Episode 13: Fly Swatters, Driver's Ed, Big Balls, Jiggle-ator with Bunnies, and Double Barrel (Ballsy's Two Ring Circus)
 Episode 14: Double Bubble Trouble, Driver's Ed, Big Balls with Aflac Duck, Jiggle-ator with Fish Tank and Clownfish, and Double Barrel In Space
 Episode 15: Wipeout Video Game Spinner, Driver's Ed, Big Balls, Jiggle-ator with Boxing Glove, and Double Barrel (Surfing Safari)
 Episode 16: Love Train, Big Balls with Dreadmill, Mood Swing with Green Ball (Lover's Leap), and Wipeout Italian Restaurant

Season 5: Winter Wipeout (2011-2012)
 Episode 1 (Deck the Balls Christmas Special): Sweet Nutcrackers, Candy Canes, Jingle Balls with Santa Motivator (called the "Ho-Ho-Ho-tivator") and Present, Snow Fall, and Santa's Workshop
 Episode 2: Snow Shovel Trouble, Big Balls with Platform Motivator and Smallsy, Snow Fall, and Candy Pain Lane
 Episode 3: Snowboard Halfpipe, Snow Boot, Big Balls with Platform Motivator and Moose, Snow Fall, and Avalanche Alley
 Episode 4: Frosty Family Tree, Winter Weasel Wheel, Big Balls with Platform Motivator and Smallsy, Snow Fall, and Ballsy's Ski Shop
 Episode 5: Buzz Saw, Big Balls with Platform Motivator and Snowman, Snow Fall, and Penguin Party
 Episode 6: (Valentine's Day): Love Struck, Big Balls with Platform Motivator and Bear, Snow Fall, and Wedding Reception
 Episode 7: Ski Launch, Ski Boot, Big Balls with Platform Motivator and Penguin, Snow Fall, and Eskimo Village
 Episode 8: H-E Double Hockey Sticks, Big Balls with Platform Motivator and Polar Bear, Snow Fall, and Yeti Country

Season 5: Summer Wipeout (2012)
 Episode 1: Fandemonium, Big Balls with Multi-vator and Nerdy Smallsy, Poundabout, and Ghoul Trouble
 Episode 2: Private Beejamin, Big Balls with Rumble Bridge Motivator and Balls Island Smallsy, Drill Sergeant, and Panic Hammocks
 Episode 3: Corporate Ladder, Big Balls with Multi-vator and Vampire Smallsy, Poundabout, and Wipeout Laundromat
 Episode 4: Henson Headshots, Big Balls with Rumble Bridge Motivator and Baseball Uniform Smallsy, Slappy Meal, and Panic Hammocks with Foam
 Episode 5: Swinging in the Rain, Swept Away, Big Balls with Rumble Bridge Motivator and Smallsy, Udderly Ridiculous, and Panic Hammocks
 Episode 6: Monkey Business, Big Balls with Multi-vator and Disco Smallsy, Poundabout, and School Daze
 Episode 7: Head Over Heels, Big Balls with Multi-vator and Super Smallsy, Poundabout (Lover's Lane), and Wipeout Nursery
 Episode 8: Batter Up, Big Balls with Rumble Bridge Motivator and Sunbathing Smallsy, Karate Class, and Panic Hammocks
 Episode 9: Bar Crawl, Big Balls with Multi-vator and Cowboy Smallsy, Poundabout, and V.I.P. Wipeout Gym
 Episode 10: Marshmallows, Big Balls with Rumble Bridge Motivator and Lifeguard Smallsy, Grin and Bear It, and Panic Hammocks
 Episode 11: Bad Buoys, Swept Away, Big Balls with Rumble Bridge Motivator and Water Skiing Smallsy, Ocean Commotion, and Panic Hammocks
 Episode 12: Aunt Pattycake, Big Balls with Multi-vator and Pirate Smallsy, Poundabout, and Surf Shack
 Episode 13: Snakes on the Plains, Big Balls with Rumble Bridge Motivator and Swimsuit Smallsy, Pulling Teeth, and Panic Hammocks
 Episode 14: Hang Ten, Big Balls with Multi-vator and Police Officer Smallsy, Poundabout, and Subway Car
 Episode 15: Wipeout Saloon, Gun Slinger, Big Balls with Rumble Bridge Motivator and Chef Smallsy, Cactus Chaos, and Panic Hammocks
 Episode 16: Cruel Bus, Big Balls with Multi-vator and Fireman Smallsy, Poundabout, and Skate Park

Season 6 (2013)
Episode 1: Barsy Bot 3000, Failboxes with Honey Badgers, Big Balls with Drill Sergeant Smallsy, Trippity Skippity Flippity Doo, and Wipeout Pizza Kitchen
Episode 2: Pork Chopper, Tropic Blunder, Big Balls with Farmer Smallsy, Tongue Twister, and Roman Splatacombs
Episode 3: Killer Croc, Tropic Blunder, Big Balls with Croc Hunter Smallsy, Tongue Twister, and Wipeout Jail
Episode 4: It's No Picnic, Failboxes with Cougars, Big Balls with Tourist Smallsy, Trippity Skippity Flippity Doo, and Aunt Pattycake
Episode 5: Cuckoo Clock, Tropic Blunder, Big Balls with Trumpsy, Tongue Twister, and Wipeout Break Room
Episode 6: Demolition Site, Tropic Blunder, Big Balls with Shredded Smallsy, Tongue Twister with Sweeper, and Wipeout Dojo
Episode 7: Turbo Snail Fail, Tropic Blunder, Big Balls with Dr. Smallsy, Tongue Twister with Sweeper, and Wipeout Ski Lodge
Episode 8: Cradle of Tough Love, Failboxes with Turtles, Big Balls with Cupid Smallsy, Trippity Skippity Flippity I Doo, and Honeymoon in Paris
Episode 9: Wipeout Marina (with Jet Skis and Fail Boat), Tropic Blunder with Vines, Big Balls with Thor Smallsy, Tongue Twister, and Wipeout Farmhouse
Episode 10: Squashbuckler, Failboxes with Dogs, Big Balls with DJ Smallsy Smalls, Trippity Skippity Flippity Doo, and Backyard BBQ
Episode 11: Tether Beater, Failboxes with Possums, Big Balls with Truck Driver Smallsy, Trippity Skippity Flippity Doo, and Wipeout Brakery
Episode 12: Picnic Peril, Tropic Blunder, Big Balls with Prince Smallsy, Tongue Twister with Sweeper, and Chopping Mall
Episode 13: Wipeout Dump, Failboxes with Cats, Big Balls with King Smallsy, Trippity Skippity Flippity Doo, and Wipeout Sushi Bar
Episode 14: Love Birds, Tropic Blunder, Big Balls with Perfect-Date Smallsy, Tongue Twister with Sweeper, and Wipeout Ant Farm
Episode 15: Medieval Castle, Failboxes with Raccoons, Big Balls with Jock Smallsy, Trippity Skippity Flippity Doo, and Wipeout Candy Shop
Episode 16: Sewage Mistreatment Plant, Failboxes with Skunks, Big Balls with Germaphobe Smallsy, Trippity Skippity Flippity Doo, and Wipeout Taco Truck

Season 7 (2014)
Episode 1: Shred Zone, Sucker Punch, Big Balls with Rumble Bridge Motivator and Smallsy, Play Pound with Foam, and Dino Dash
Episode 2: Door Knockers, Sucker Punch, Big Balls with Rumble Bridge Motivator and Nerdsy, Play Pound, and Robo-Bistro
Episode 3: Baseball Bash, Sucker Punch, Big Balls with Rumble Bridge Motivator and Uncle Smallsy, Play Pound, and All-American BBQ Blitz
Episode 4: Pillars of Atlantis, Sucker Punch, Big Balls with Rumble Bridge Motivator and Cupid Smallsy, Play Pound with Foam, and Jill's Apartment
Episode 5: Door Knockers (The Johns), Sucker Punch, Big Balls with Rumble Bridge Motivator and Rocker Smallsy, Play Pound, and Monster Truck
Episode 6: Angry Organ Grinder, Sucker Punch, Big Balls with Love Motivator and Baby Smallsy, Play Pound, and Italian Restaurant Splurgio's
Episode 7: Beavers and Beaverettes, Sucker Punch, Big Balls with Rumble Bridge Motivator and Drama Queen Smallsy,  Play Pound with Foam and Rubber Duck, and Gym Class
Episode 8: Door Knockers, Sucker Punch, Big Balls with Rumble Bridge Motivator and Peg-Leg Smallsy, Play Pound, and SS Booty Shaker
Episode 9: Mayan Ruins, Sucker Punch, Big Balls with Rumble Bridge Motivator and Judge Smallsy, Play Pound with Foam, and Divorce Court
Episode 10: Pink Slip, Sucker Punch, Big Balls with Rumble Bridge Motivator and Basketball Uniform Smallsy, Play Pound, and Smallsy Factory
Episode 11: Wipeout Shores, Sucker Punch, Big Balls with Rumble Bridge Motivator and Baron von Smallsy, Play Pound, and Dracula's Haunted Condo
Episode 12: Wipeout Space Station, Sucker Punch, Big Balls with Rumble Bridge Motivator and Hippie Smallsy, Play Pound, and Spring Broken
Episode 13: Chopper Blades, Sucker Punch, Big Balls with Rumble Bridge Motivator and Gladiator Smallsy, Play Pound with Foam and Plastic Sharks, and Wall of Pain

Season 8 (2021-2022)
Episode 1: Sweep and Weep, Nutcracker, Big Balls with Rumble Bridge Motivator and Cowboy Smallsy, Body Blender, and Jiggleator with Rainbow Block
Episode 2: Spanker Planks, Tosser Tumbler, Big Balls with Rumble Bridge Motivator and Chef Smallsy,  Body Blender, and Jiggleator with Wedge
Episode 3: Sweep and Weep, Nutcracker, Big Balls with Rumble Bridge Motivator and DJ Smallsy, Body Blender, and Jiggleator with Block
Episode 4: Sweep and Weep, Nutcracker, Big Balls with Rumble Bridge Motivator and Thor Smallsy, Body Blender, and Jiggleator with Rainbow Block
Episode 5: Spanker Planks, Tosser Tumbler, Big Balls with Rumble Bridge Motivator and Hippie Smallsy, Body Blender, and Jiggleator with Wedge
Episode 6: Spanker Planks, Tosser Tumbler, Big Balls with Rumble Bridge Motivator and Disco Smallsy, Body Blender, and Jiggleator with Wedge
Episode 7: Sweep and Weep, Nutcracker, Big Balls with Rumble Bridge Motivator and Lifeguard Smallsy, Body Blender, and Jiggleator with Rainbow Block
Episode 8: Spanker Planks, Tosser Tumbler, Big Balls with Rumble Bridge Motivator and King Smallsy, Body Blender, and Jiggleator with Wedge
Episode 9: Spanker Planks, Tosser Tumbler, Big Balls with Rumble Bridge Motivator and DJ Smallsy, Body Blender, and Jiggleator with Wedge
Episode 10: Sweep and Weep, Nutcracker, Big Balls with Rumble Bridge Motivator and Vampire Smallsy, Body Blender, and Jiggleator with Block
Episode 11: Hoop Hopper, Rumble Road, Big Balls with Rumble Bridge Motivator and Beauty Queen Smallsy, Body Blender, and Jiggleator with Wedge
Episode 12:(The Suicide Squad Special) Hoop Hopper, Rumble Road, Big Balls with Rumble Bridge Motivator and Love Doctor Smallsy, Body Blender, and Jiggleator with Wedge
Episode 13: Wallop Wall, Spin Cycle, Big Balls with Rumble Bridge Motivator and Basketball Uniform Smallsy, Body Blender, and Jiggleator with Wedge
Episode 14: Hoop Hopper, Rumble Road, Big Balls with Rumble Bridge Motivator and Uncle Smallsy, Body Blender, and Jiggleator with Wedge
Episode 15: Wallop Wall, Spin Cycle (With Foam and Dodgeballs), Big Balls with Rumble Bridge Motivator and Paparazzi Smallsy, Body Blender, and Jiggleator with Wedge
Episode 16:(S9) Facetime with Nicole, Slosh Bucket Basher, Big Balls with Hidden Airbag Motivator and Firefighter Smallsy, Insta-Slam, and Backboned
Episode 17: Hoop Hopper, Rumble Road, Big Balls with Rumble Bridge Motivator and Baby Smallsy, Body Blender, and Jiggleator with Wedge
Episode 18: Wallop Wall, Spin Cycle (With Foam), Big Balls with Rumble Bridge Motivator and Safari Smallsy, Body Blender, and Jiggleator with Wedge
Episode 19: (S9) Ding Dong Damage, Big Balls with Hidden Airbag Motivator and Baby Smallsy, Insta-Slam, and Backboned
Episode 20: (Road to Redemption) Wallop Wall, Spin Cycle, Big Balls with Rumble Bridge Motivator and Sun  Bathing Smallsy, Body Blender, and Jiggleator with Wedge

Season 9 (2023-) (TBS has not premiered the season yet, but episodes are airing outside of the US (CTV Canada, AXN Asia)
Episode 1: N/A
Episode 2: Facetime With Nicole & Slosh Bucket Basher, Big Balls with Hidden Airbag Motivator and Smallsy, Insta-Slam, and Backboned
Episode 3: N/A
Episode 4: N/A
Episode 5: N/A
Episode 6: Facetime With Nicole & Slosh Bucket Basher, Big Balls with Hidden Airbag Motivator and Lifeguard Smallsy, Insta-Slam, and Backboned
Episode 7: N/A
Episode 8: (S8) Wallop Wall & Spin Cycle (With Foam), Big Balls with Rumble Bridge Motivator and Rocker Smallsy, Body Blender, and Jiggleator with Wedge
Episode 9: N/A
Episode 10: N/A
Episode 11: Facetime with Nicole & Slosh Bucket Basher, Big Balls with Hidden Airbag Motivator and Gladiator Smallsy, Insta-Slam, and Backboned
Episode 12: N/A
Episode 13: N/A
Episode 14: N/A
Episode 15: N/A
Episode 16: N/A
Episode 17: (S8) Hoop Hopper & Rumble Road, Big Balls with Rumble Motivator and Smallsy, Body Blender, and Jiggleator with Wedge
Episode 18: Facetime With Nicole & Slosh Bucket Basher, Big Balls with Hidden Airbag Motivator and Safari Smallsy, Insta-Slam, and Backboned
Episode 19: N/A
Episode 20: N/A

(ABC ORIGINAL) In the second round, the twelve remaining contestants compete in a competitive challenge. 
(TBS REBOOT) In the second round, the six remaining teams are split into two heats, in which only one team on each heat will advance.

Round Two
These have included:

The Sweeper: The twelve contestants stand on 10-foot-high poles/pedestals as the arm moves in a sweeping motion. They must jump over the arm to avoid being knocked into the water below. As time goes on, the arm will move faster and rise higher. The final six contestants standing move on to the next round, and the last person standing wins a $1,000 bonus. In Season 1, Episode 9, the rules are the same, except the final eight contestants standing move on to the next round. In Season 7, the rules are the same, except the last person standing wins a $500 bonus.

Versions of the Sweeper:
Sweeper: The twelve contestants stand on 10-foot-high poles as the arm moves in a sweeping motion. They must jump over the arm to avoid being knocked into the water below. As time goes on, the arm will move faster and faster and rise higher and higher. The final six contestants standing move on to the next round, and the last person standing wins a $1,000 bonus.
Sack Sweeper: The twelve contestants stand on 10-foot-high poles while wearing sacks as the Sweeper moves in a circular motion. They must hop over the arm to avoid being knocked into the water below. As time goes on, the Sweeper will move faster and faster and rise higher and higher. The final six contestants standing move on to the next round, and the last person standing wins a $1,000 bonus.
Toothbrush Sweeper: The twelve contestants stand on 10-foot-high poles as the Sweeper moves in a circular motion. They must jump over the arm and the toothbrush bristles to avoid being knocked into the water below. As time goes on, the Sweeper will move faster and faster and rise higher and higher. The final six contestants standing move on to the next round, and the last person standing wins a $1,000 bonus.
Sweeper Dodgeball: The twelve contestants stand on 10-foot-high poles while holding dodgeballs as the Sweeper moves in a circular motion. They must jump over the arm to avoid being knocked into the water below. They can throw their dodgeballs at each other during the game. As time goes on, the Sweeper will move faster and faster and rise higher and higher. The final six contestants standing move on to the next round, and the last person standing wins a $1,000 bonus.
Hoop Sweeper: The twelve contestants stand on 10-foot-high poles as the Sweeper moves in a circular motion. They must jump over the arm and through the giant hoop to avoid being knocked into the water below. As time goes on, the Sweeper will move faster and faster and rise higher and higher. The final six contestants standing move on to the next round, and the last person standing wins a $1,000 bonus.
Crowbar Sweeper: The twelve contestants stand on 10-foot-high poles as the Sweeper moves in a circular motion. They must jump over the arm and the smoking crows to avoid being knocked into the water below. As time goes on, the Sweeper will move faster and faster and rise higher and higher. The final six contestants standing move on to the next round, and the last person standing wins a $1,000 bonus.
The Crusher: The twelve contestants stand on 10-foot-high poles as two arms move in a sweeping motion. They must jump between the arms to avoid being knocked into the water below. As time goes on, the arms will squeeze tighter and tighter and move faster and faster. The final six contestants standing move on to the next round, and the last person standing wins a $1,000 bonus.
Triple Threat Sweeper: The twelve contestants stand on 10-foot-high poles as the Crusher moves in a sweeping motion. They must jump through the Crusher and the dodge the junior wrecking ball and the ice-cold smoke to avoid being knocked into the water below. As time goes on, the Crusher will move faster and faster and squeeze tighter and tighter. The final six contestants standing move on to the next round, and the last person standing wins a $1,000 bonus.
Gyro Sweeper: The twelve contestants stand on 10-foot-high pedestals as the Sweeper moves in a circular motion. They must jump over the Sweeper to avoid being knocked into the water below. But when John Henson pulls the magic lever, the gyro arm at the end of the Sweeper will begin to gyrate in a circular motion as well. Then they’ll have to time it correctly and decide whether to jump over or duck under the gyro arm. As time goes on, the Sweeper and the gyro will move faster and faster. The final six contestants standing move on to the next round, and the last person standing wins a $1,000 bonus.
Classic Sweeper: The twelve contestants stand on 10-foot-high pedestals as the Sweeper moves in a circular motion. They must jump over the Sweeper to avoid being knocked into the water below. As time goes on, the Sweeper will move faster and faster and rise higher and higher. The final six contestants standing move on to the next round, and the last person standing wins a $1,000 bonus.
Mace Sweeper: The twelve contestants stand on 10-foot-high pedestals as the Sweeper moves in a circular motion. They must jump over the arm and dodge the hanging spiked mace to avoid being knocked into the water below. As time goes on, the Sweeper will move faster and faster and rise higher and higher. The final six contestants standing move on to the next round, and the last person standing wins a $1,000 bonus.
Gyro Sweeper (with distracting fingers): The twelve contestants stand on 10-foot-high pedestals as the Sweeper moves in a circular motion. They must jump over the Sweeper and through the fingers to avoid being knocked into the water below. But when John Henson pulls the magic lever, the gyro arm at the end of the Sweeper will begin to gyrate in a circular motion as well. Then they’ll have to time it correctly and decide whether to jump over or duck under the gyro arm. As time goes on, the Sweeper and the gyro will move faster and faster. The final six contestants standing move on to the next round, and the last person standing wins a $1,000 bonus.
Sack Gyro Sweeper: The twelve all-star contestants stand on 10-foot-high pedestals while wearing sacks as the Sweeper moves in a circular motion. When John Henson pulls the magic lever, the gyro arm at the end of the Sweeper will begin to rotate as well. They’ll have to time it correctly and decide whether to hop over or duck under the gyro arm to avoid being knocked into the water below. As time goes on, the Sweeper and the gyro will move faster and faster. The final six all-star contestants standing move on to the next round, and the last person standing wins a $1,000 bonus.
Gyro Crusher: The twelve contestants stand on 10-foot-high pedestals as the Crusher moves in a sweeping motion. They must jump through the Crusher to avoid being knocked into the water below. But when John Henson pulls the magic lever, the gyro arm at the bottom of the Crusher will begin to gyrate in a circular motion and squeeze tightly with the stationary arm on top. Then they’ll have to time it correctly and decide whether to jump over or duck under the gyro arm. As time goes on, the Crusher and the gyro will move faster and faster. The final six contestants standing move on to the next round, and the last person standing wins a $1,000 bonus.
Ball Crusher: The twelve contestants stand on 10-foot-high poles as the Crusher moves in a sweeping motion. They must jump through the Crusher and the hanging balls to avoid being knocked into the water below. As time goes on, the Crusher will move faster and faster and squeeze tighter and tighter. The final six contestants standing move on to the next round, and the last person standing wins a $1,000 bonus
Cheese Sweeper: The twelve contestants stand on 10-foot-high pedestals as the Sweeper moves in a circular motion. They must jump over the arm and the wedge of cheese to avoid being knocked into the water below. As time goes on, the Sweeper will move faster and faster and rise higher and higher. The final six contestants standing move on to the next round, and the last person standing wins a $1,000 bonus.

King of the Mountain: The twelve contestants stand on 10-foot-high pedestals as a platform moves in a circular motion. They must jump onto the platform, make their way to one of the stairways, and climb up to one of the six red spots on the edge of the mountain. They also have to avoid two giant clubs and rubber donuts rotating in the opposite direction. If they wipeout, they must head back and start all over. The first six contestants to make it onto the mountain move on to the next round.
Overdrive: The twelve contestants stand on a 10-foot-high starting platform as a steering wheel moves in a circular motion. They must enter the steering wheel on the green spot, exit off the red spot, and cross one of the three obstacles: the Unstable Table, the Banana Hammock, and the Spinning Green Ball to the finish platform. They also have to avoid the yellow windshield wipers and four sweeper arms rotating in the opposite direction. If they wipeout or go under one of the sweeper arms, they must head back and start all over. The first six contestants to make it across move on to the next round.
Double Cross: The twelve contestants stand on a 10-foot-high starting platform as four planks move in a circular motion. They must enter on one of the three green planks, exit off the red plank, and cross the Unstable Table to the finish platform. They also have to avoid four sweeper arms rotating in the opposite direction. If they wipeout, they must head back and start all over. The first six contestants to make it across move on to the next round. Distractions can be featured in some episodes, including a wrecking ball, foam, or water explosions.
Ski Lift (Winter Wipeout): The twelve contestants start together on floating platforms 10 feet above the icy water as they move in a circular motion. They must hold onto the handlebars and use them to lift themselves up and over the sweeper arms to avoid being knocked into the water. As if it wasn’t difficult enough, the sweeper arms will rise higher and higher. The last six contestants standing move on to the next round, and the last person standing wins a $1,000 bonus.
Scare-ousel (Love Machine on Summer Episode 16), (Spring Wipeout/Summer Wipeout): A carnival-themed carousel made up of two stages: a red track and a yellow track. The twelve contestants begin together on the starting platform elevated 10-feet above the water. Then at the sound of the horn, they’ll hop across a set of pedestals, grab a red dangler, and swing over three hurdles, moving up and down, to the red platform. If they wipeout, they must swim back to beginning. Once they land on the red platform, they must go up the steps and catch a ride on the yellow dangler to the finish platform all while avoiding the sweeper arms. If they wipeout here, they can swim back to the yellow platform and try again. In episode 5 of Spring Wipeout (The Most Dramatic Rose Ceremony Ever), three blue danglers were added for increased difficulty. The first six contestants to make it through move on to the next round.
The Illusionator, (Summer Wipeout; first episode only): The twelve contestants start together on platforms elevated 10 feet above the water. They must navigate through the Spinning Hoops to avoid being knocked into the water. If they go under them, they’re out. The last six contestants standing move on to the next round, and the last person standing wins a $1,000 bonus.
Total Carnage, (Summer Wipeout): The twelve contestants begin together on the starting platform elevated 10 feet above the water. The goal is simple: make it around to the finish platform by leaping from platform to platform while navigating over the whirling Crankshaft and between the Spinning Hoops without going under them. The first six contestants to make it to the other side move on to the next round.
Pain in the Ice, (Winter Wipeout Season 5) First, all twelve contestants will drop through the Ice Hole and onto the Fishing Pole for a spin to the landing platform. Then it’s a tricky balancing act across the Lumber Tumbler to the other side. That’s followed by a hair-raising trip across the Frosty Footbridge while avoiding the spanker bar and being showered by the Arctic Waterfall. And finally, its belly slide down the Snow Chute to the finish platform. The first six contestants to make it through move on to the next round.
Hangover (Summer Wipeout Season 5): The twelve contestants begin together on the starting platform elevated 10 feet above the water. The idea is simple: grab a rotating handle and swing around to the finish platform while navigating through the Swizzle Sticks, over the Sweeper Arm, and through the Brawl Wall. The first six contestants to make it to the other side move on to the next round.
Scaregrounds: (Summer Wipeout Season 5) The twelve contestants start on a spinning platform. Then at the sound of the horn, they’ll grab a rotating trapeze and swing over the sweepers to the revolving planks before riding them to a second spinning platform. But they’ll have to watch out for the Signwinder, because it’s spinning too. Then they must jump to the Spinning Slide and time their drop down onto the finish platform. The first six contestants to make it through move on to the next round. 
Miami Pound Machine: (Summer Wipeout Season 6) The twelve contestants begin together on the starting platform elevated 10 feet above the water. They must jump onto one of the rotating platforms, make their way to the other side, and time their jump to the finish platform. They also have to avoid the rotating sweeper bars along the way. If they wipeout or go under one of the sweeper bars, they must head back and start all over. The first six contestants to make it across move on to the next round.
Octopushy: (Summer Wipeout Season 6) The twelve contestants begin together on the starting platform elevated 10 feet above the water. They must jump onto one of the rotating rings, make their way to the other side, and time their jump to the finish platform. They also have to avoid Ollie's rotating arms along the way. If they wipeout or go under one of the arms, they must head back and start all over. The first six contestants to make it across move on to the next round.
 Space Race: (Summer Wipeout Season 7) First, slide through the Wormholes and land on the Flying Saucer, then drop through the hole onto the Crop Circles, and make the jump to the Launch Slide. If you wipeout, it’s back to the beginning. If you make it through the first part, then you won’t have to go back to the start. Finally, drop down the Launch Slide and into the Shifting Alien and jump out onto the finish platform. The first six contestants to make it through move on to the next round.
Classic Sweeper: (Summer Wipeout Season 7) The twelve contestants start together on pedestals elevated 10 feet above the water. They must jump over the rotating sweeper bar in order to avoid being knocked into the water. If they go under the bar, they’re out. The last six contestants standing move on to the next round, and the last person standing wins a $500 bonus.
The Gauntlet: (Summer Wipeout Season 8) Season 8 merged the two middle rounds into one massive round called The Gauntlet. There are two heats with three teams, the first heat consists of teams placed 2nd, 4th and 6th in the qualifier, while the second heat consists of teams placed 1st, 3rd and 5th in the qualifier. It starts with the Carous-Hell, where contestants drop onto a spinning sweeper arm, land and navigate to four spinning handles. After grabbing on, contestants have to avoid falling into the water by another sweeper bar. Once both teammates are across, they move onto the Messy Mile. Contestants must slide down into the mud, squeeze though a selection of shapes cut out in a wall. After that, contestants must zipline downwards to the next platform (even if they fall into the mud, they are allowed to go forward). Next is two big hills they must cross over while slime is being sprayed at them. Finally, they both will have to climb Mount Wipeout and drop into the Pummel Pool. After a short swim, contestants have to climb a ladder, leading to a jump onto pink big ball and the Tippy Table. After that, they have a decision between the Fast Fries, a set of vertical rotating sweeper bars, or the Lollipop, a large spinning platform with 2 arms. They will be able to attempt both obstacles, but once they clear one, their final obstacle is a pink big ball with a short leap to the finish platform. Only one team will advance, and both teammates need to make it to the end to make it to the Wipeout Zone.
The Gauntlet: (Season 9 Summer Wipeout)
 Even though the new season have yet to air, TBS released 2 previews featuring obstacles from season 9. The Gauntlet is in the same format as before, featuring three main obstacles that must be completed. Before the round starts, contestants sit in the Dizzy Dummy, a large spinning graviton spinning at high speeds. When the round starts, contestant must get up and leap onto a platform, all while continuing to spin. 
Next, contestants make their way to the Revolver, a choice of two playground slides leading towards a revolving platform. Contestants must land onto that platform and jump to safety. Once both teammates make it across, they can face the last obstacle.
Finally, contestants must face the Spun and Done, a giant spinning circle with and intersection leading to the middle. Contestants enter on the platform marked with the green arrow and must navigate their way across to the platform with the red arrow. Contestants must jump over multiple sweeper bars in their way. After leaping over the final sweeper bar, contestants slide down onto the finish platform. The first team with both teammates across make it to the Wipeout Zone.

Season 1
 Sweeper (Normal)
 Sack Sweeper (Normal but contestants were given sacks to wear)
 Toothbrush Sweeper (Normal but with toothbrush bristles on the arm)
 Sweeper Dodgeball (Normal but contestants were given dodgeballs to throw)
 Hoop Sweeper (Normal but with a giant hoop on the arm)
 Crowbar Sweeper (Normal but with smoking crows on the arm)
 The Crusher (A double Sweeper that squeezes tighter and tighter)
 Sweeper (Normal except the last eight contestants standing move on to the next round)
 Triple Threat Sweeper (Normal but with ice-cold smoke and a junior wrecking ball)

Season 2
 Football King of the Mountain (Normal but contestants had to carry a football with them the entire time)
 Gyro Sweeper (Normal but the arm gyrates instead of rising, and contestants have to decide whether to jump or duck)
 King of the Mountain (Normal)
 Classic Sweeper (Normal)
 King of the Mountain (Normal)
 King of the Mountain (Normal)
 Mace Sweeper (Normal but with a hanging spiked mace)
 Gyro Sweeper (with distracting fingers) (Normal but with five fingers)
 King of the Mountain (Normal but you need to have both members of the couple on the mountain so you could have six people on it and no one moving on)
 Gyro Sweeper (Normal)
 King of the Mountain (Normal)
 Sack Gyro Sweeper (Normal but contestants were given sacks to wear just like in Season 1)
 King of the Mountain Dodgeball (Normal but contestants were giving dodgeballs to throw)
 Gyro Crusher (Normal but the bottom arm gyrates instead of rising)
 King of the Mountain (Normal)
 Ball Crusher (Normal but with hanging balls)
 Cheese Sweeper (Normal but with a wedge of cheese on the arm)

Season 3
 Overdrive (Top)
 Double Cross (Top)
 Double Cross (Top)
 Overdrive (Top)
 Overdrive (Top)
 Double Cross (Top)
 Double Cross (Top)
 Overdrive (Top)
 Double Cross (Top)
 Overdrive (Top)
 Double Cross (Top)
 Overdrive (Top)
 Double Cross (with the Wrecking Ball)
 Overdrive (Top)
 Overdrive (Top)
 Double Cross (Top)
 Overdrive (Top)
 Double Cross (with red, white, and blue sweeper arms) 

Season 4: Winter Wipeout
 Ski Lift (Top)
 Ski Lift (Top)
 Ski Lift (Top)
 Ski Lift (Top)
 Ski Lift (Top)
 Ski Lift (Top)
 Ski Lift (Top)
 Ski Lift (Top)

Season 4: Spring Wipeout
 Scare-ousel (Top)
 Scare-ousel (Top)
 Scare-ousel (Top)
 Scare-ousel (Top)
 Scare-ousel (With Giant Blue Dinghies) 
 Scare-ousel (Top)
 Scare-ousel (Top)

Season 4: Summer Wipeout
 The Illusionator (Top)
 Total Carnage (Top)
 Scare-ousel (With Yellow Double Danglers) 
 Scare-ousel (Top)
 Total Carnage (Top)
 Scare-ousel (With Yellow Double Danglers) 
 Scare-ousel (Top)
 Total Carnage (Top)
 Total Carnage (Top)
 Scare-ousel (Top)
 Total Carnage (Top)
 Total Carnage (Top)
 Total Carnage (Top)
 Total Carnage (Top)
 Total Carnage (Top)
 Scare-ousel (Love Machine) (Top)

Winter Wipeout: Deck the Balls Christmas Special
 Pain in the Ice (Top)

Season 5: Winter Wipeout
 Pain in the Ice (Top)
 Pain in the Ice (Top)
 Pain in the Ice (Top)
 Pain in the Ice (Top)
 Pain in the Ice (Top)
 Pain in the Ice (Top)
 Pain in the Ice (Top)

Season 5: Summer Wipeout
 Scaregrounds (Top)
 Hangover (Top)
 Scaregrounds (Top)
 Hangover (Top)
 Hangover (Top)
 Scaregrounds (Top)
 Scaregrounds (Top)
 Hangover (Top)
 Scaregrounds (Top)
 Hangover (Top)
 Hangover (Top)
 Scaregrounds (Top)
 Hangover (Top)
 Scaregrounds (Top)
 Hangover (Top)
 Scaregrounds (Top)

Season 6: Summer Wipeout
 Octopushy (Top)
 Miami Pound Machine (Top)
 Miami Pound Machine (Top)
 Octopushy (Top)
 Miami Pound Machine (Top)
 Miami Pound Machine (Top)
 Miami Pound Machine (Top)
 Octopushy (Top)
 Miami Pound Machine (Top)
 Octopushy (Top)
 Octopushy (Top)
 Miami Pound Machine (Top)
 Octopushy (Top)
 Miami Pound Machine (Top)
 Octopushy (Top)
 Octopushy (Top)

Season 7: Summer Wipeout
  Space Race (Top)
  Space Race (Top)
  Space Race (Top)
 Classic Sweeper (Top)
  Space Race (Top)
  Space Race (Top)
 Classic Sweeper (Top)
  Space Race (Top)
 Classic Sweeper (Top)
  Space Race (Top)
  Space Race (Top)
  Space Race (Top)
 Classic Sweeper (Top)

Season 8: Summer Wipeout
 The Gauntlet (Top)
 The Gauntlet (Top)
 The Gauntlet (Top)
 The Gauntlet (Top)
 The Gauntlet (With Dangler)
 The Gauntlet (Top)
 The Gauntlet (Top)
 The Gauntlet (Top)
 The Gauntlet (With Dangler)
 The Gauntlet (Top)
 The Gauntlet (With Dangler)
 The Gauntlet (With Dangler)
 The Gauntlet (With Dangler)
 The Gauntlet (With Dangler)
 The Gauntlet (With Dangler)
 The Gauntlet (Season 9 Gauntlet)
 The Gauntlet (With Dangler)
 The Gauntlet (With Dangler)
 The Gauntlet (Season 9 Gauntlet)
 The Gauntlet (With Dangler)

Season 9: Summer Wipeout
 The Gauntlet (Top)
 The Gauntlet (Top)
 The Gauntlet (Top)
 The Gauntlet (Top)
 The Gauntlet (Top)
 The Gauntlet (Top)
 The Gauntlet (Top)
 The Gauntlet (Top)
 The Gauntlet (Top)
 The Gauntlet (Top)
 The Gauntlet (Top)
 The Gauntlet (Top)
 The Gauntlet (Top)
 The Gauntlet (Top)
 The Gauntlet (Top)
 The Gauntlet (Top)
 The Gauntlet (Top)
 The Gauntlet (Top)
 The Gauntlet (Top)
 The Gauntlet (Top)

(Since not all Episodes have been released, Variants are N/A for now)

Round Three
The remaining contestants participate in a challenge that varies with each episode.

Season 1 variations included the "Dizzy Dummy"; a cycle of four competitive rounds where the six contestants are strapped to the Dizzy Dummy and spun around until they’re good and dizzy. Then they race across one of two obstacles. The first person to the platform advances to the Wipeout Zone. The remaining five get back on the Dizzy Dummy, spin, and run again but take on the other obstacle. The first person to the platform there moves on, and the others will "spin again"; and a time-based challenge known as the "Dreadmill", which sees contestants run on a giant treadmill with the best four times advancing, either highest or lowest depending on the task, including dodging a giant swinging wrecking ball and running to the end while lifting doors. 
 Episode 1 - Tippy Tables and Hopping Blocks (Dizzy Dummy)
Rules: There are four rounds. First, the six contestants will all be strapped to the Dizzy Dummy and spun around until they’re good and dizzy. Then they go down the Tippy Tables, and the first person to the platform will win and move on. The other five get back on the Dizzy Dummy, spin, and run again but this time do the Hopping Blocks. First person to the platform there will move on, and the others will spin again.
 Episode 2 - Tennis Dreadmill With Doors
Rules: Each of the six contestants must make it across the Dreadmill and through three doors to the other side. They also have to avoid tennis balls and the flour pit along the way. If they fall, the Dreadmill will slow down to make it easier. The four best times advance to the Wipeout Zone.
 Episode 3 - Crazy Beams and Pole Vault (Dizzy Dummy)
Rules: There are four rounds. First, the six contestants will all be strapped to the Dizzy Dummy and spun around until they’re good and dizzy. Then it’s off to the Crazy Beams, and the first person across to the platform will move on to the Wipeout Zone. The rest will then get back on the Dizzy Dummy, spin, and run again but this time try the Pole Vault. First person to the platform there will move on, and the others will spin again.
 Episode 4 - Dreadmill Flipper Flop
Rules: Each of the six contestants must stay on the Dreadmill and out of the Danger Zone for as long as possible while wearing flippers. They also have to avoid inflatable stuff and foam. As time goes on, the Dreadmill will move faster and faster. The four best times advance to the Wipeout Zone.
 Episode 5 - Slippery Snakes and Barrel Spill (Mexican Dizzy Dummy)
Rules: For four rounds, the six contestants will all be strapped to the Dizzy Dummy and spun around until they’re good and dizzy. Then they‘ll face the Slippery Snakes, and the first person to the platform moves on to the Wipeout Zone. The remaining five get back on the Dizzy Dummy, spin, and run again but this time do the Barrel Spill. First person to the platform there will advance, and the others will spin again.
 Episode 6 - Dreadmill Wrecking Ball
Rules: Each of the six contestants must stay on the Dreadmill and out of the Danger Zone for as long as possible. They also have to avoid the Wrecking Ball hanging from above. As time goes on, the Dreadmill will move faster and faster, and the Wrecking Ball will get lower and lower. The four best times advance to the Wipeout Zone.
 Episode 7 - (NONE) Wipey’s Awards
 Episode 8 - Floating Block Maze and Teeter Totters (Dizzy Dummy)
Rules: There are four rounds. First, the six contestants will all be strapped to the Dizzy Dummy and spun around until they’re good and dizzy. Then they face the Floating Block Maze, and the first person to reach the platform moves on. The remaining five get back on the Dizzy Dummy, spin, and run again but this time take on the Teeter Totters. First person to the platform there will advance, and the others will spin again.
 Episode 9 - Daunting Cookie Cutter (pilot episode)
Rules: Each of the eight contestants must jump onto the rotating platform and make it through four obstacles. There are ladders at each checkpoint, so you won’t have to go back to the start. Once through all the obstacles, they have to get back to where they started to stop the clock. The four best times advance to the Wipeout Zone.
 Episode 10 - Roadwork Dreadmill With Goofy Goggles and Cones
Each of the six contestants must stay on the Dreadmill and out of the Danger Zone for as long as possible while wearing goofy goggles. They also have to avoid traffic cones and sludge. As time goes on, the Dreadmill will move faster and faster. The four best times advance to the Wipeout Zone.
 Episode 11 - (NONE) Top 25 Moments

Season 2 saw the return of the Dizzy Dummy but now the contestants need to squeeze through an obstacle at the top of a spinner before they could go on to the main obstacle. The "Slippery Course", is similarly formatted, but uses a water slide instead of spinning the contestants. The Dreadmill is replaced by "The Rocket" or "Bucking Bull" which has the contestants ride a mechanical bull or a flying rocket ship for as long as possible. During this round, it was merely an endurance event. The top four times move onto the Wipeout Zone.
 Episode 1 (Super Bowl) - Field Goal Spinner, Teeter Totters, and Keg Run (Football Dizzy Dummy 2.0)
Rules: There are four rounds. First, the six contestants will all be strapped to the Dizzy Dummy and spun around until they’re good and dizzy. Then it’s on to the Spinner, where they have to climb through the goalposts before they can move on. Next, it’s the Teeter Totters, and the first person to the platform goes to the Wipeout Zone. The remaining five get back on the Dizzy Dummy, spin, and run the course again but this time do the Keg Run. First person to the platform there will move on, and the others will spin again.
 Episode 2 - Slick Slide, Branch in the Face, Bullseye Buoys, Slippery Wall With Ropes, and Spinner (Slippery Course)
Rules: There are four rounds. First, the six contestants will all start at the top of the Slick Slide, where it’s a race to the bottom and dash toward Branch in the Face. Then it’s on to the Bullseye Buoys, shifting platforms that are specially designed for wipeouts. And finally, the Spinner, where the first person to stand up on the center platform advances. The remaining five then have to run the course again, only this time face the Slippery Wall, where they’ll have to use the ropes to make their way across to the other side. Like before, one person advances, and the others will run the course again.
 Episode 3 - Door Spinner, Tippy Tables with Walls, and Barrel Run (Dizzy Dummy 2.0)
Rules: There are four rounds. First, the six contestants are strapped to the Dizzy Dummy and spun around until they’re good and dizzy. Then they take on the Spinner, where they have climb through the door before they can move on. Next, it’s on to the Tippy Tables, and the first person to the platform moves on. The remaining five get back on the Dizzy Dummy, spin, and run the course again but this time do the Barrel Run. First person to the platform there will move on, and the others will spin again.
 Episode 4 - The Rocket With Planets and Meteor Showers
Rules: Each of the six contestants must stay on the flying rocket ship for as long as possible. It’s 15 feet in the air and at the end of a rotating arm. The longer they ride it, the faster it goes. They also have to avoid being knocked off by one of the planets in the Wipeout Galaxy and meteor showers. The best four times advance to the Wipeout Zone.
 Episode 5 - Bungee Web Spinner, Sack Launch, and Zig Zag Buoy Run (Dizzy Dummy 2.0)
Rules: For four rounds, the six contestants will all be strapped to the Dizzy Dummy and spun around until they’re good and dizzy. Then they move on to the Spinner, where they have to navigate their way through the bungee web. Next, they move on to the Sack Launch, "sack" because it’s a giant sack of air, and "launch" because when you’re on it and another person jumps on, you get launched, and the first person to make it to the platforms moves on. The remaining five get back on the Dizzy Dummy, spin, and run the course again but this time attack the Zig Zag Buoy Run. First person to the platform there will move on, and the others will spin again.
 Episode 6 - Bungee Web Spinner, Teeter Totters, and Crazy Beams (Dizzy Dummy 2.0)
Rules: There are four rounds. First, the six contestants will all be strapped to the Dizzy Dummy and spun around until they’re good and dizzy. Then they’ll take on the Spinner and navigate through the bungee web. Then it’s on to the Teeter Totters, and the first person to the platform moves on. The remaining five get back on the Dizzy Dummy, spin, and run the course again but this time do the Crazy Beams. First person to the platform there will move on, and the others will spin again.
 Episode 7 - The Rocket With Planets and Astronaut Major John Henson
Rules: Each of the six contestants must stay on the flying rocket ship for as long as possible. It’s 15 feet in the air and at the end of a rotating arm. The longer they ride it, the faster it goes. They also have to avoid being knocked off by one of the planets in the Wipeout Galaxy and rocket fuel from Astronaut Major John Henson. The best four times advance to the Wipeout Zone.
 Episode 8 - Slick Slide, Branch in the Face, Bouncy Beam with Sweepers, Slippery Wall with Spinning Triangles, and Bumper Spinner (Slippery Course)
Rules: There are four rounds. First, the six contestants will all start at the top of the Slick Slide, where it’s a quick slick race to the bottom and right to Branch in the Face. Then it’s a balancing act across the Bouncy Beam, all the while trying to avoid the four sweeper arms. First person to make onto the Spinner and stand on the center platform advances. The other five go at it again, this time facing down the Slippery Wall with three spinning triangles. The winner advances, and the rest will do it again.
 Episode 9 - Keyhole Spinner, Sweeper Buoy Run, and Rope Swing (Dizzy Dummy 2.0)
Rules: There are at least four rounds. First, the three couples will all be strapped to the Dizzy Dummy and spun around until they’re good and dizzy. Then it’s on to the Spinner, where they have to climb through the keyhole before they can move on. Next, it’s on to the Sweeper Buoy Run, and the first person to the platform wins the round, but doesn’t have a spot in the Wipeout Zone until the other member of the couple wins a round as well. So the remaining five get back on the Dizzy Dummy, spin, and run the course again but this time do the Rope Swing. First person to the platform there will win, and the others will spin again.
 Episode 10 - Bucking Bull
Rules: Each of the six contestants must stay on the mechanical bull for as long as possible. It’s 15 feet in the air and at the end of a rotating arm. The longer they ride it, the faster it spins, and the harder it bucks. The best four times advance to the Wipeout Zone.
 Episode 11 - Keyhole Spinner, Buoy Run, and Wall Squeeze (Dizzy Dummy 2.0)
Rules: There are four rounds. First, the six contestants will all be strapped to the Dizzy Dummy and spun around until they’re good and dizzy. Then they face the Spinner and attempt to make the dizzy even dizzier by climbing through the keyhole. Then they must make it through the Buoy Run, and the first person to the platform moves on. The remaining five get back on the Dizzy Dummy, spin, and run the course again but this time do the Wall Squeeze. First person to the platform there will move on, and the others will spin again.
 Episode 12 - Bucking Bull With Red Capes
Rules: Each of the six all-star contestants must stay on the mechanical bull for as long as possible. It’s 15 feet in the air and at the end of a rotating arm. The longer they ride it, the faster it spins, and the harder it bucks. They also have to go through red capes hanging from above. The best four times advance to the Wipeout Zone.
 Episode 13 - Bungee Web Spinner, Beam Walk Dodgeball, and Blue Ball Run (Dizzy Dummy 2.0)
Rules: For four rounds, the six contestants will all be strapped to the Dizzy Dummy and spun around until they’re good and dizzy. Then it’s on to the Spinner, where they have to make their way up through the bungee web. Next, they’ll have to face Beam Walk Dodgeball, and the first person to the platform moves on. The remaining five get back on the Dizzy Dummy, spin, and run the course again but this time navigate the Blue Ball Run. First person to the platform there will move on, and the others will spin again.
 Episode 14 - Slick Slide With Colored Balls, Branch in the Face, Mesh-Mash Run, Slippery Wall With Ropes and Spinning Triangles, and Bumper Spinner (Slippery Course)
Rules: For four rounds, the six contestants will all start at the top of the Slick Slide, where it’s a quick race to the bottom and burst through colored balls and right to Branch in the Face. Then it’s on to the Mesh-Mash Run, where they must climb across the rubber belt to the other side. Then it’s on to the Spinner, and the first person to stand on the center platform advances to the Wipeout Zone. The remaining five run the course again, but this time take on the Slippery Wall with ropes and spinning triangles. Again, first person to the center of the Spinner moves on, and everyone else will run again.
 Episode 15 - Bungee Web Spinner, Topple Towers, and Slippery Snakes (Dizzy Dummy 2.0)
Rules: There are four rounds. First, the six contestants will be strapped to the Dizzy Dummy and spun around until they’re good and dizzy. Then they’ll face the Spinner and attempt to make the dizzy even dizzier by making their way through the bungee web. Then they must make it over the Topple Towers, and the first person to the platform advances. The remaining five get back on the Dizzy Dummy, spin, and run the course again but this time challenge the Slippery Snakes. First person to the platform there will move on, and the others will spin again.
 Episode 16 (Australia Special) - Pole Vault and Donut Run (Dizzy Dummy)
Rules: There are four rounds. First, the six contestants will all be strapped to the Dizzy Dummy and spun around until they’re good and dizzy. Then it’s on to the Pole Vault, and the first person to the platform moves on. The remaining five get back on the Dizzy Dummy, spin, and run again but this time do the Donut Run. First person to the platform there will move on, and the others will spin again.
 Episode 17 - Slick Slide With Cereal, Branch in the Face, Bucking Buoys, Slippery Wall with Spinning Pegs, and Bumper Spinner (Slippery Course)
Rules: There are four rounds, which all begin at the Slick Slide, where the six contestants will have to make their way down the slide and through a helping of breakfast cereal. Then they’ll take a path through Branch in the Face on the way to the Bucking Buoys. And finally, the Bumper Spinner, where the first person to stand on the center platform moves on to Wipeout Zone. The rest head back to the beginning and run again, but this time take on the Slippery Wall with three spinning pegs. One person there will advance, and the rest will run it again.

Season 3 uses the "Circular Challenge" a circular, individually run, time-based obstacle which circles around a central podium. This course always has a theme such as "One-Ring Circus" (Clowns throw circus objects at the player from the central podium), "Jungle Gym" (Safaris throwing snakes and bananas), "Medieval Wipeout" (Knights hurling tomatoes and lettuce from the podium), "Construction Zone" (Construction workers throwing cones), "Wipeout Farm" (Farmers throwing haystacks and yolk), and "Pirate's Revenge" (Pirates throwing cannonballs from the middle). The top four times advance to the Wipeout Zone.

Another round called "Bruiseball" is used in some episodes which has contestants have to get past all four bases with obstacles in the shape of a Baseball field. First, the six contestants will all go for a spin on the Dizzy Dummy or sit together on the Benches. Then at the crack of the bat, they’ll run down the first baseline, over the Pedestals, onto the Pitcher’s Mound Spinner, over the Tippy Table, and onto first base all while avoiding the swinging Bruiseball bats. Once safely on the bag, they’ll have to make it to second down the Bouncing Base Path. To steal third, they’ll have to survive a rundown on the Turntables/Slidewalks. And to score a run, they have to dive headfirst from the Diving Boards and tag Home Plate before landing in the mud below. There are two innings, and the first two contestants to score before the end of each inning move on to the Wipeout Zone. 

Also in Season 3 is a challenge that features a rotating spinner previously featured in Season One's Wipeout Zone, which the six contestants start together on and must stay on for as long as possible while jumping over the sweeper arm to avoid being knocked into the water below. If they go under or around the sweeper arm, they’re out. Costumed characters called "lifeguards" in the middle of the spinner throw items at the contestants based on the theme of the week. Variations of items thrown at the contestants include suitcases and boxes on "Unclaimed Baggage" (known for housing John Henson), pillows, feathers, blankets, and stuffed animals on "Sleepytime", beach items and wet towels on "Beach Party", car cleaning stuff (with a bristled brush and strips of destruction) on the "Car Wash", food (with a "Lazy Susan" spinner) on the "Food Fight", and a barrage of patriotic projectiles (with apple pies) on the "American Revolution". In addition, the contestant who grabs the brass ring earns a $1,000 bonus. There are four rounds, and the last person standing at the end of each round moves on to the Wipeout Zone.

Season 4 (Winter Wipeout): The third round was called the "7-Letter Word", which consists of seven platforms that spelled the word, WIPEOUT. The six contestants will start at the "W", and the first one to the "T" wins. They must avoid the sweeper arms on the "W" and "I," go through the puddle on the "P," bounce off the "E" diving boards onto the spinning "O," and jump over the three hurdles on the "U" to get to the "T" platform. If they wipe out after reaching the "P", the "E", or the "U", they can return to those points instead of starting the entire course over. There are three rounds, and the first person through before the end of each round moves on to the Winter Wipeout Zone. In episode 4 (Baby It's Blob Outside), there was a person in a polar bear costume scaring contestants on the "P".

In episode 5 of Winter Wipeout (Hockey Pucks and Bieber Fever), the "7-Letter Word" was replaced by another obstacle course called the "Winter Blunder Land (Wipeout Ice Arena)". For three rounds, the six contestants start out on the "Dizzy Dummy". Then they jump off the diving boards onto the "Spinning Slap Shot" and make it over the "Penalty Box". Then they weave their way through the "Crankshaft". After that, they try to avoid being checked by the "Knee Sweeper", then jump to the “Turntable” and spin their way to the finish platform. While crossing the course, they'll try to avoid giant hockey pucks being thrown at them by two hockey players (one of them being John Henson) and a female skater. The first contestant through before the end of each round moves on to the Winter Wipeout Zone.

In episode 7 of Winter Wipeout (Some People Just Don't Know When to Quit), "Winter Blunder Land (Mount Wipeout)" was featured again. For three rounds, the six contestants start out on the "Dizzy Dummy". Then they jump off the diving boards onto the "Rotating Platform" and make it over the "Bouncy Board". Then they weave their way through the "Crankshaft". After that, they try to avoid being checked by the "Knee Sweeper", then jump to the “Turntable” and spin their way to the finish platform. While crossing the course, they'll try to avoid welcome gifts from the ski bunny and snow dude. The first contestant through before the end of each round moves on to the Winter Wipeout Zone.

In episode 8 of Winter Wipeout (Family Night, Kids Eat It for Free), "Winter Blunder Land (Wipeout Alps)" was featured once again. It's exactly the same only the three families will try to deal with the locals and their goat as they make their way through the course for two rounds. The first complete family through before the end of each round moves on to the Winter Wipeout Zone.

Season 4 (Spring Wipeout): The third round was called the "Not So Okay Corral". There are three rounds that start on this western-themed obstacle course. First, the six contestants take a spin on the classic "Dizzy Dummy". Then they bounce off the diving boards onto the "Rotating Platform" and make it over the "Bouncy Board". After that, they weave their way through the "Crankshaft". Next is the "Knee Sweeper", then the "Turntable" and one final step to the finish platform all while avoiding faux horseshoes and moneybags being thrown at them when crossing the course. The first contestant through before the end of each round moves on the Spring Wipeout Zone.

In episode 2 of Spring Wipeout (Ballsy Shows Off His Giblets), the background was a French café called "Springtime in Paris", in which contestants were hit by pies.

In episode 3 of Spring Wipeout (John Henson, Zombie Hunter), the background was a Roman coliseum called the "Wipeout Colosseum", in which contestants were hit by tar (chocolate sauce), foam shields, and stuffed toy lions. First, the six contestants take a spin on the classic "Dizzy Dummy". Then they bounce off the diving boards onto the "Colosseum Wall" and make it over the "Bouncing Podium". After that, they weave their way through the "Crankshaft". Next is the "Knee Sweeper", then the "Turntable" and one final step to the finish platform.

In episode 4 of Spring Wipeout (The Wizard of Owws), the background was a theme called the "Arabian Nights", complete with a desert sand, toy snakes, and an oasis. The contestants must run the course while avoiding Persian throw-pillows and plush cobras being thrown at them. First, the six contestants take a spin on the classic "Dizzy Dummy". Then they bounce off the diving boards onto the "Rotating Platform" and make it over the "Bouncy Board". After that, they weave their way through the "Crankshaft". Next is the "Knee Sweeper", then the "Spinning Persian Rug" and one final step to the finish platform.

In episode 5 of Spring Wipeout (The Most Dramatic Rose Ceremony), there was a new obstacle called "Super Tramp". The six contestants start together on trampolines elevated 10 feet above the water. They must bounce over the rotating sweeper bar to avoid being knocked into the drink. If they go under the bar, they're out. There are three rounds, and the last person standing at the end of each round moves on to the Spring Wipeout Zone. It was later featured in episode 4 of Summer Wipeout (At Full Tilt).

In episode 6 of Spring Wipeout (Dirty Laundry), the "Clean Sweep" was featured. The six contestants start together on platforms elevated 10 feet above the water. They must jump over the gradually rising sweeper bar as it rotates around and around to avoid being knocked into the drink. If they go under the bar, they’re out. There are three rounds, and the last person standing at the end of each round moves on to the Spring Wipeout Zone.

In episode 7 of Spring Wipeout (Engaged Couples) using episodes 1-4 obstacle, the background was a Wedding chapel theme called the "Wipeout Wedding". The engaged couples must run the course while avoiding pieces of cake and frosting thrown by a couple dressed in each other's clothes (groom in a gown, bride in a tuxedo), and John Henson dressed as the priest for two rounds. First, the three engaged couples take a spin on the classic "Dizzy Dummy". Then they bounce off the diving boards onto the "Spinning Threshold" and make it over the "Bouncing Alter". After that, they weave their way through the "Crankshaft Aisle". Next is the "Knee Sweeper", then the "Turntable" and one final step to the finish platform. The first complete engaged couple through before the end of each round moves on the Spring Wipeout Zone.

Season 4 (Summer Wipeout) features the "Wipeout Play Set". First, all six contestants start off with the “Safe and Durable Swing Along Swing Sets,” where they have to hurl themselves to the spinning platform. Then they have to go for a whirl on the "Sweeper Arms," crossing from one to the other as they rotate at alarming speeds. And finally, they’ll face “Chutes and Splatters,” where they must slip down one of the slides and through the rotating windmill to the other side. And then it’s just a quick sprint to the finish spot to complete the course. There are three rounds, and the first person through before the end of each round moves on to the Wipeout Zone.

In episode 3 of Summer Wipeout (Let's Make A Wipeout) the "Dive Bar" was featured. The six contestants start together on platforms elevated 10 feet above the water. They must jump over a giant snorkel as it rotates around and around to avoid being knocked into the water. If they go under the snorkel, they’re out. There are three rounds, and the last person standing at the end of each round moves on to the Wipeout Zone.

In episode 6 of Summer Wipeout (All Stars), "Jump the Shark" was featured. The six all-star contestants start together on platforms elevated 10 feet above the water. They must jump over the rising Great White Shark as it rotates around and around to avoid being knocked into the water. If they go under the shark, they’re out. There are three rounds, and the last person standing at the end of each round moves on to the Wipeout Zone.

In episode 7 of Summer Wipeout (You're All Acting Like Babies!), the "Sushi Bar" was featured. The six contestants start together on platforms elevated 10 feet above the water. They must jump over a rotating salmon sushi roll-covered sweeper bar to avoid being knocked into the sake. If they go under the bar, they’re out. There are three rounds, and the last person standing at the end of each round moves on to the Wipeout Zone.

In episode 8 of Summer Wipeout (Boss and Employee), the obstacle "Wipeout 500" race track was featured. There are two rounds. First, all three boss-employee teams must make it past two yellow "Street Sweepers." Then they have to cross the rotating "Spinner Change." Finally, they have to motor down to the "Stuttering Straightaways" en route to the checkered flag at the finish platform all while being pegged by tires and checkered flags thrown by the pit crew. The first complete boss-employee team through before the end of each round moves on to the Wipeout Zone.

In episode 9 of Summer Wipeout (“Ballsy Gets a Hard Hat”), the obstacle “Detour” is featured where the Wipeout crew are dressed in construction gear that took a detour to the “Construction Zone” on a hazardous hydraulic speedway. There are three rounds. First, all six contestants will drive into the construction zone and make it past not one, but two “Street Sweepers.” After that, they must cross the rapidly-rotating “Spinner Change.” And finally, it’s a trip across both “Rocking Roadblocks” en route to the finish platform. The first contestant through before the end of each round moves on to the Wipeout Zone.

In episode 10 of Summer Wipeout ("Is That a Potato in Your Sack or Are You Just Happy to Wipeout?"), the "Super Sack" was featured. The six contestants start together on platforms elevated 10 feet above the water while wearing potato sacks. They must hop over the sweeper bar as it rotates around and around to avoid being knocked into the drink. If they go under the bar, they’re out. There are three rounds, and the last person standing at the end of each round moves on to the Wipeout Zone.

In episode 11 of Summer Wipeout ("Bucking Broncos and Jiggling Monkeys"), the “Wipeout Playset” is featured again, but it’s different. It starts on the “Slippy Slides”, where all six contestants must soar onto the spinning platform. Then they have to take a whirl on the “Sweeper Arms,” crossing from one to the other as they rotate at alarming speeds. And finally, they must leap from the “Diving Boards” and through the rotating windmill to the other side. And then it’s just a quick sprint to the finish spot to complete the course. There are three rounds, and the first person through before the end of each round moves on to the Wipeout Zone.

In episode 12 of Summer Wipeout ("Ballsy's Playground"), the obstacle "Detour" is featured again where the Wipeout crew are dressed as an old retirement couple that took a detour to "Ballsy National Forest" on their RV trip. It's exactly the same only the crew throws pillows and sleeping bags at the contestants as they make their way through the course.

Season 4 (Summer Wipeout) continues with the Wipeout theme obstacles where each contestant starts off with a ride on the spinner where they have to get across an obstacle course filled with different types of rotating platforms on their way down to the finish platform, where winners of the three rounds move to the Wipeout Zone.

In episode 16 of Summer Wipeout (Blind Date 2.0: This Could Get Ugly), the obstacle "Wipeout Disco" is featured. There are three rounds. First, the four blind date couples start off by "staying alive" by not going for a spin on the "Dizzy Dummy" and jumping off springboards into the "Brick House". Then they have to pass the "Bouncer" (bouncing platform). Next, they have to get into the club and pass the rotating "Crankshaft" while they beat around the "Knee Sweeper". Then they boogie over to the "Turntable" to the finish platform all while the Wipeout dancers throw faux disco balls and sponge vinyl records at them. The first complete blind date couple through before the end of each round moves on to the next round.
This episode also featured another third round obstacle called the "Singles Bar." The three blind date couples start together on platforms elevated 10 feet above the water. They must jump over the rising sweeper bar as it rotates around and around to avoid being knocked into the "sea of love". If they go under the bar, they’re out. The last person standing wins the round but has to wait for his or her date to also win a round so they can move on together. The first two complete blind date couples to make it out of the event advance to the Wipeout Zone.

Season 5 (Winter Wipeout) An obstacle called "The Cold Hearted Snake". First, all six contestants must cross the two Snow Sweepers. Then they have to climb up and slide down Plummet Summit and over the snake's back. Finally, they must cross the Shivering Timbers, jump to the Snowball, and jump to the finish platform. The Snowball rises up to make the finish easier. The first three contestants to make it through move on to the Winter Wipeout Zone.

Season 5 (Summer Wipeout) An obstacle called "Petrified Forest". First, all six contestants will use the zip-lines to swing down to the forest floor. Then they'll hop a branch for a ride through the One Tree Forest while avoiding the Sweeper Logs. Then it’s a leap into the Tippy Trap and a final jump out to the finish platform. The first three contestants to make it through move on to the Wipeout Zone.

Season 5 (Summer Wipeout) An obstacle called "Spin Psycho". First, all six contestants will grab the first sweeper bar and ride it to the first turntable. Then they’ll grab the second sweeper bar and ride to the second turntable. Finally, they’ll grab the third sweeper bar and time their drop down the slippy slide to the finish platform. The first three contestants to make it through move on to the Wipeout Zone.
 
Season 6 (Summer Wipeout) An obstacle called "Wipeout's Greatest Hits". First, all six contestants will start together on a spinning drum. Then at the sound of the horn, they’ll make their way across the drums and ride the drumsticks to the landing platform. Then they’ll make their way across the keyboards to the next platform. In some episodes, the keyboards had fingers on them. Finally, they’ll jump through the swinging guitar to the finish platform. The first three contestants to make it through move on to the Wipeout Zone.

Season 6 (Summer Wipeout) An obstacle called "Wipeout City". First, all six contestants will make their way across the Bridge Over Troubled Water. Then they’ll grab a rotating handle and swing on the Helicopters over the sweeper bars to the Spinning Helipad. Then they’ll balance across the Water Main, shimmy across the Power Lines, and time their drop through the Manhole and into the water. The first three contestants to make it through move on to the Wipeout Zone.

Season 6 (Summer Wipeout) An obstacle named "Sugar Smacks". First, all six contestants will start together on a spinning cake. Then at the sound of the horn, they’ll jump onto a spinning candle and ride it to the platform while jumping through the Spinning Life Savers and over the Candy Stick. Then they’ll climb up the Cake Ladder and slide down the Lemon Drop and through the windmill to the finish platform. The first three contestants to make it through move on to the Wipeout Zone.

Season 7 (Summer Wipeout) An obstacle named "Fun Slides Platform Spinning Purple People Beater". Start on the First Slide, then land on the platform. Then navigate through the Sweeper Gauntlet to the other side. If you wipeout, it’s back to the beginning. If you make it to the Smack Wheel Slide, then you won’t have to go back to the start. Finally, time your drop down the spinning slide and through one of the four holes on the smack wheel to the finish platform. The first four contestants to make it through move on to the Wipeout Zone.

Seasons 8/9 (Summer Wipeout) Season 8 does not have a Round Three, and it is the same with Season 9.

Wipeout Zone
At night, and with a more serious tone than the previous rounds, the final four or three contestants play separately on a large obstacle course called the Wipeout Zone, each attempting to finish the course in the fastest time, much like the first round. Though slight variations are used in each episode, contestants wear wetsuits and they begin by either sliding down a water ramp or being launched by a giant catapult or blob into the water and swim to the first obstacle. Obstacles have varied between episodes, but the course contains several obstacles that must be traversed in order to reach the finishing platform. The maximum time for any contestant in the Wipeout Zone is 20:00.00 in the first six seasons. The player with the fastest time on the course is declared the "champion" of the episode and is awarded the show's grand prize of $50,000. In Season 7, the Zone was all about speed, and the contestants were given 1 attempt per obstacle. In the Australia Special it was the same as season 7 but they had to complete the launch pads In the reboot, the Wipeout Zone was done "Relay Style", with each teammate completing the first or last two obstacles. The fastest time was awarded $25,000.

 Season 1:
 1. Killer Surf: A 45° ramp contestants slide down on an inner tube, a sled, an air mattress, or their backs and into the water below. In some episodes, it had water pouring down. In episode 2, it was covered in foam. In episodes 3, it had scorching flames erupting at the bottom. In episode 4, it was surrounded by fire. In episode 8, it was shrouded in fog and had colored balls at the bottom.
 2. Barrel Run: A narrow ramp which contestants must run up while jumping over oncoming barrels.
 3. Climbing Wall: A wall above a narrow ledge that contestants must cross using handles. In episodes 4 and 5, it was renamed the Rope Wall, because there were ropes instead of handles. In episodes 6, 8, and 10, it was renamed the Water Wall, because there was water pouring down on the contestants as they use the handles to get across.
 4. Spinner: A rotating slippery surface covered in padded barricades which contestants must jump on, and then onto a platform on the other side. In one episode, there was latex, making two entrances.
 5. Launch Pads: Four trampolines at different elevations and distances that must be crossed to reach the finish platform.

 Pilot Episode:
 1. Killer Surf: A 45° water ramp contestants slide down on a sled and into the water below.
 2. Triple Threat (A.K.A Rotating Triangles): Three triangles that can rotate if not crossed quick enough.
 3. Spinner: A rotating slippery surface covered in padded barricades which contestants must jump on, and then onto a platform on the other side.
 4. Blast Off: Two narrow planks sprayed by icy cold water cannons that must be crossed.

 Season 2A:
 1. Aqua Launch: A bumpy water ramp contestants slide down on an inner tube, a sled, a bodyboard, a kayak, or their backs and attempt to control their launch into the Wipeout Zone.
 2. Raging Rapids: A ramp with water flowing down contestants must climb while trying to avoid being washed away by a onetime 1,000-gallon tidal wave. This tidal wave has varied during the series, being either water, mud, or drink (sports drink and blue drink).
 3. Climbing Wall: A wall above a narrow sloped ledge that contestants must cross using handles.
 4. Crazy Sweeper: Contestants run down a zigzag beam and across pedestals to the other side while being chased by two sweeper arms featuring large cubes and cylinders on them. In Wipeout Bowl 1, they had footballs and pon-poms on them. In episode 4, the obstacle had six hanging demolition balls. In episode 8, it had two distracting curtains of noodles. In episode 12, it had six brutal punching bags.
 5. Turntables: Three spinning platforms with varying obstacles that the contestants must jump on and off. When they stand up with two feet planted on the last turntable or the finish platform, the clock will stop. In Wipeout Bowl 1, they were the Tackle Dummy Turntables. In episodes 2 and 14, they were the Bumper Turntables. In episodes 4 and 10, they were the Wedge Turntables. In episode 5, they were the Torrential Turntables. In episode 8, they were the Foamy Turntables. In episode 12, they were the Dodgeball Turntables.

 Season 2B:
 1. Catapult: A rocket launcher that launches contestants into the Wipeout Zone.
 2. Gears of Doom: Three large rotating gears that must be traversed. In episodes 6 and 16, the gears had teeth on them. In episode 9, the gears were covered with trampolines.
 3. Scary-Go-Round: A pair of bridges circling in opposite directions. Contestants must cross the plank, head up the stairs, then make it across the arm to the other side while avoiding the sweeper arm. In episode 6, it had three teeth, while in episode 16, it had just one tooth. In episode 7, it had a curtain. In episodes 9 and 11, four of the six stairways were blocked. In episode 11, it had two wrecking balls.
 4. Gauntlet: Consisting of three obstacles:
 1. Piston Punch: Three pistons that punch out into the walkway. The contestants must cross without getting punched into the water.
 2.A. Turntable: A spinning platform with varying obstacles that the contestants must jump on and off. In episode 1, it was the Foamy Turntable. In episode 3, it was the Bumper Bally Turntable. In episode 7, it was the Gazebo Turntable. In episode 9, it was the Wedge Turntable. In episodes 11 and 13, it was the Bumper Turntable.
 2.B. Blades of Fury: Two windmills contestants have to jump through without being knocked off into the water.
 3. Dangerous Drop Bridge: A bridge designed to drop out from under them at any time as they cross it to the finish platform. In episodes 6 and 16, it had three teeth on it.

 Australia Special:
 1. Killer Surf: A 45° water ramp contestants slide down on a lie lo and into the water below.
 2. Barrel Run: A narrow ramp which contestants must run up while jumping over oncoming barrels.
 3. Water Wall: A wall with water pouring down above a narrow ledge that contestants must cross using handles.
 4. Spinner: A rotating slippery surface covered in padded barricades which contestants must jump on, and then onto a platform on the other side.
 5. Log Roll: A slippery rolling log contestants must run across.
 6. Launch Pads: Two trampolines at different elevations and distances that must be crossed to reach the finish platform and hit the buzzer to stop the clock.

 Season 3A:
 1. Catapult: A rocket launcher that launches contestants into the Wipeout Zone. In episode 4, it had white dust. In episode 17, it had colored balls.
 2. Spin Cycle: A huge thirty foot circular tall drum which the contestants must enter on one side, then exit at the other onto a narrow platform. In some episodes, it had foam. In episode 15, it had molten lava. In episode 17, it had hundreds of balls.
 3. Triple Threat: Three turntables in a row that contestants must cross upon while avoiding the sweeper arms. In episodes 4 and 15, it had streamers. In episode 17, it had hanging balls.
 4. Rib Rage: Ten ribs that jut out at the bottom, creating a sort of walkway which the contestants must cross. The ribs drop out from under the contestants as they run. They can only do this obstacle once.
 5. Gauntlet: Consisting of two obstacles:
 1. Spiked Whackers: Two flapping panels with spikes on them that flap into the walkway and the contestants must avoid. The flaps are fired as they try to cross it for the first time, although John A. and John H. avoid saying it. However, after the first attempt, the flaps fire in a sequence the contestants can time their jumps with.
 2. Arms and Dangerous: A narrow walkway with spinning arms that are right in the running path of the contestants. The contestants must time their run past each arm carefully to avoid being knocked into the water and reach the other side before making one more small jump to the finish platform. In episode 17, balls were being thrown at the contestants.

 Season 3B:
 1. Dreadmill Launch: A forward-moving dreadmill inside a laser tunnel contestants must run down, free-fall onto a giant sloped trampoline, and bounce into the water below. In some episodes, there was a Sheer Descent water wall pouring down. In one episode, the trampoline was covered with foam.
 2. Gut Busters: Six hydraulic blocks at varying heights moving up and down that must be traversed. In episode 3, they had a galaxy of planets. In episode 16, they had a hoop.
 3. Sinistairs: A spinning spiral staircase on the outside of a rotating tower contestants must climb while avoiding two or three sweeper arms.
 4. Gauntlet: Consisting of three obstacles:
 1. Crankshaft: A narrow platform next to a rotating beam. Contestants must time their moves carefully to avoid the beam.
 2. Blades of Fury: Two windmills contestants have to jump through without being knocked off into the water.
 3. Beater Totter: A hydraulic seesaw that moves about as the contestants cross it to the finish platform. In episode 16, it had a hoop.

 Season 4A - Winter Wipeout
 1. Bobsled Blastoff: A mechanical bobsled that launches contestants through the air into the water below.
 2. Icy Stairway from Hell: An arc of stairs that are lifted up and down from their sides.
 3. Frostbite: Two slowly rotating platforms with four teethed sweeper arms moving in the opposite direction.
 4. Sinister Snowflakes: Two rotating rigs with 7 spokes that the contestants must cross to finish the course.

 Season 4B - Spring Wipeout/Summer Wipeout
 1.A. Spring-shot: A mechanical spring that blasts contestants through the air into the water below. In one episode, it had colored balls. (Spring)
 1.B. Chairborne: A chair that blasts contestants through the air into the water below. (Spring and Summer) 
 2. Over and Out: Two giant rotating walkways the contestants must cross.
 3. Point Break: An obstacle made up of two parts. First, the contestants must climb to the peak of the slippery staircase while being shot by flying paint and/or trying to hold out when gallons of water splash down on them. Then they have to time their drop down the steep slide onto the platform below.
 4. Coin Toss: Seven spinning coins that will try to flip contestants into the water as they balance their way across to the finish platform.

 Season 4C - Summer Wipeout
 1. Towering Flume of Doom: A 7 story tall water slide that launches contestants into the Wipeout Zone.
 2. Iron Mazen: A giant rotating maze. Contestants must enter on the yellow side and exit on the red side all while battling gravity, momentum, and speed of the rotating maze.
 3. Axle of Evil: A three-pronged disk at the end of an arm twists around whilst the whole arm rotates in a circle. Contestants must use each peg to support themselves as they are carried around to cross the next platform.
 4. Great Wall of Fall: A fifty-foot-long wall containing of several cylindrical pistons that randomly retract into the side. Contestants must make their way along the moving pistons to the finish platform.

Season 5A - Winter Wipeout
 1. Killer Luge: A 7 story steep slide that launches contestants into the Wipeout Zone.
 2. Psychedelic Snow Globe: A huge vertically spinning circle with cylinder pegs on it. In the middle, there is a button. When contestants hit the button, the exit platform will drop. They only tag the center button once.
 3. Frozen Fury: Elevated platforms in a semicircle that contestants must cross avoiding the sweepers.
 4. Iced Over: Three vertically spinning diamonds. Contestants must cross them to get to the finish platform.

Season 5B - Summer Wipeout
 1. Bombastic Blob: A big sack of air that launches contestants into the Wipeout Zone when hit by a half-ton weight.
 2. Swing Blades: Two sets of sweeper swings and blades that contestants must cross to get to the other side.
 3. Torrential Twisters: Three wet, slippery turntables that lead to the next platform.
 4. Tectonic Planks: Two rotating planks, each with two pegs. Contestants must go over at least one peg to continue.

Season 5C – Summer Wipeout
 1. Temple of Flume: An 8 story water slide that launches contestants into the Wipeout Zone.
 2. Commakaze: A rotating blind slide contestants have to time their drop down and under the period to make it to the other side without paying the price.
 3. Spinergy: A rotating ring contestants have to balance on while avoiding a series of punishing sweeper bars.
 4. 3 C's of Wipeout: Three rotating C’s contestants must mind the gaps when jumping to another one. In one episode, balls were being thrown at the contestants.

Season 6A:
 1. Scare Chair: A reverse catapult that launches contestants into the Wipeout Zone. 
 2. Blockbuster: A giant rocking wall filled with unstable blocks which contestants must cross without getting busted to get to the other side.
 3. Space Pod of Doom: A rotating orbiter "pod" which contestants have to ride inside and drop through one of the escape hatches onto the exit platform and not into the water.
 4. Bounder Pounder: 2 sets of 3 rotating trampolines which contestants have to bounce their way across to reach the finish platform.

Season 6B:
 1. Slingshock: A launcher that launches contestants into the water.
 2. Throw-tisserie: A hot obstacle shaped like a rotisserie. Run across planks without losing your balance to drop onto the moving exit platform.
 3. Dark Side of the Moon: An obstacle with a slide in the center. Contestants jump onto the planetary ring and make it pass 2 sets of sweeper bars. Then they must climb the ladder to the top and time their drop down the steep blind slide and through the dark center of the moon to the platform.
 4. Twisted Falls: An obstacle with trampolines, torrential waterfalls, and spinning blades. Contestants must jump on the trampolines and bounce through the waterfalls and blades to make it to the finish platform.

Season 7:
 1. Catastrophic Cannon: A cannon that launches contestants into the water.
 2. Shredder: Two rotating cones contestants have to sprint across in order to make it to the next obstacle.
 3. Hell's Carousel: An obstacle where contestants have to run on pedestals while hammer-shaped sweeper arms follow them and try to knock them off.
 4. Gears of Fear: 3 huge gears. Contestants have to grind through the rotating gears, leap to the spinning gear, and jump through the whirling fan blades to the finish platform. However, if they were to fail, they would have to climb up a ladder to reach the finish platform.

Season 8:
 1. Speeding Silver Bullet: A rocket that launches contestants into the water.
 2. Vertigo: A huge vertically spinning contraption with cylinder pegs on it. In the middle, there is a button that contestants must hit to drop the exit platform. Once doing so, contestants have to leap onto the platform and tag their teammate to advance. They only tag the center button once.
 3. Leap of Faith: A rotating hammerhead shaped spinner which contestants drop onto, then jump onto a narrow platform to reach the next obstacle.
 4. Triple Threat: Three rotating hexagon platforms, with smaller half-diamond shaped platforms within the middle. Contestants jump across either shaped platforms to the finish platform.
(Both team members are on the Zone at the same time. The first team member will complete the Speeding Silver Bullet and Vertigo. Then they must tag their partner for them to start the Leap of Faith and the Triple Threat).

Season 9:
 1. Drop Out: A 75 foot long waterslide that shoots contestants out and into the water.
 2. Point Break: A big spinning cylinder with large spikes sticking out. Contestants must navigate across the tube and onto the platform without falling off. Once completed, contestants must tag their teammate to advance.
 3. G-Force: A fast-spinning bridge with two platforms at each end, an entrance and an exit, where contestants must walk across and leap off onto a platform.
 4. Grinder: 3 Gigantic spinning gears, two vertical ones at the start and finish, with a horizontal gear in the middle, leading towards the finish platform.
(Both team members are on the Zone at the same time. The first team member will complete Drop Out and Point Break. Then they must tag their partner for them to start G-Force and the Grinder).

References

Obstacles
Obstacle racing